Dowlehtu (also Romanized as Dowlehtū) is a village in Melkari Rural District, Vazineh District, Sardasht County, West Azerbaijan Province, Iran. As per the 2006 census, its population was 255, in 39 families.

References 

Populated places in Sardasht County